Buddhism is the largest religion in Thailand, practiced by over 93% of the population. Buddhism is the State religion as per the Thai constitution, despite which, it guarantees religious freedom for all Thai citizens, though the king is required by law to be a Theravada Buddhist.  Many other people, especially among the Isan ethnic group, practice Tai folk religions. A significant Muslim population, mostly constituted by Thai Malays, is present especially in the southern regions. Thai law officially recognizes five religions: Buddhism, Islam, Hinduism, Sikhism, and Christianity.

Demographics

According to official census data approximate 95% of Thais follow Buddhism. However, the religious life of the country is more complex than how it is portrayed by such statistics. Of the large Thai Chinese population, most of those who follow Buddhism have been integrated into the dominant Theravada tradition, with only a small minority having retained Chinese Buddhism. Otherwise, a large part of the Thai Chinese have retained the practice of ethnic Chinese religion, including Taoism, Confucianism and Chinese salvationist religions (such as Yiguandao and the Church of Virtue). Despite being practised freely, these religions have no official recognition, and their followers are counted as Theravada Buddhists in statistical studies. Also, many Thai and Isan practise their ethnic Tai folk religion.

Muslims are the second largest religious group in Thailand at 4% to 5% of the population. Thailand's southernmost provinces — Pattani, Yala, Narathiwat, Satun, Trang, and part of Songkhla — have large populations of Muslims, consisting of both ethnic Thai and Malay. 

Christians, mainly Catholics, represent just over 1% of the population. A small but influential community of Sikhs in Thailand and some Hindus, mostly live in the country's cities and are engaged in retail commerce. There is also a small Jewish community in Thailand, dating back to the 17th century.

According to the 2015 Gallup International survey, Thailand was the most religious country of the 65 countries polled, with 94% of Thais identifying as religious.

Censuses

Overview

Religions by region
According to the 2015 census, 67,328,562 Thailand residents in the different regions of the country belonged to the following religious groups:

Religions by province
According to the 2010 census, Thailand residents in the different provinces of the country belonged to the following religious groups:

Indic religions

Buddhism

Buddhism in Thailand is largely of the Theravada school. Over 90% of Thailand's population adheres to such school.

Thai Buddhism is practised alongside various indigenous religions, such as Chinese indigenous religion by the large Thai of Chinese origins, Hinduism among Thai of Indian origin and Siamese Thai people, and Thai folk religion among Northeastern Thai, Northern Thai and Northern Khmer people.

Buddhist temples in Thailand are characterised by tall golden stupas, and the Buddhist architecture of Thailand is similar to that in other Southeast Asian countries, especially Cambodia and Laos, which share a cultural and historical heritage with Thailand.

Hinduism

Several thousand Hindus of Indian origin live in Thailand, mainly in the larger cities. Besides this group of "traditional Hindus", Thailand in its earliest days was under the rule of the Khmer Empire, which had strong Hindu roots, and the influence among Thais remains even today. There are also some ethnic Cham Hindus living in Thailand. The popular Ramakien epic based on Buddhist Dasaratha Jataka is very similar to the Hindu Ramayana. The former capital of Ayutthaya was named for Ayodhya, the Indian birthplace of the Rama, the protagonist of the story.
There is a class of  brahmins who perform rituals for Hindu gods. Brahmin rituals are still common. Hindu-Buddhist deities are worshipped by many Thais and statues and shrines of Brahma, Ganesh, Indra, Shiva, Vishnu, Lakshmi and other Hindu-Buddhist gods are a common sight (for example the Erawan Shrine area). Another relic of Hinduism is Garuda, now a symbol of the monarchy.

Folk religions

Chinese folk religion 

Many within the large Thai Chinese population (excluding the Peranakans) practise various Chinese religions, including the worship of local gods, Chinese ancestral worship, Taoism, Confucianism and Chinese salvationist religions. One of the latter, Yiguandao (Thai: Anuttharatham), spread to Thailand since the 1970s, and it has grown so popular to come into conflict with Buddhism; in 2009 there were more than 7000 Yiguandao churches in the country and approximately 200.000 people convert each year into the religion. Despite the large number of followers and temples these religions have no state recognition, their temples are not counted as places of worship, and their followers are counted as "Theravada Buddhists" in officially released religious figures. Chinese temples are called sanchao in Thai language.

The Chinese folk religion of Thailand has developed local features, including the worship of local gods. Major Chinese festivals such as Nian, Zhongqiu, and Qingming, are widely celebrated, especially in Bangkok, Chonburi, and other parts of Thailand where there are large Chinese populations. Thai of Teochew and Hoklo origin generally worship Guanyin and Mazu, while Cantonese origin worship Guan Yu.

Peranakan folk religion 

The Peranakans in the city of Phuket practise a nine-day vegetarian festival between September and October. During the festive season, devotees will abstain from meat and mortification of the flesh by Chinese mediums is also commonly seen. The rites and rituals are devoted to the veneration of Tua Pek Kong. Such traditions were developed during the 19th century in Phuket by the local Chinese with influences from Malay and Southern Thai culture.

Thai folk religion 

Most of Northeastern Thai (as well as Northern Thai, Northern Khmer and some Siamese Thai) practise distinctive indigenous religions characterised by worship of local gods and ancestors. They are very similar to the Chinese folk religion.

Abrahamic religions

Islam

According to the 2015 census, Thailand has 2,892,311 Muslims, or 4.29% of the total population. 2,227,613 of these Muslims are concentrated in the southern region of the country, where they represent up to 24.33% of the population.

Christianity

Christianity was introduced by European missionaries as early as the 1550s, when Portuguese mercenaries and their chaplain arrived in Ayutthaya. Historically, it has played a significant role in the modernisation of Thailand, notably in social and educational institutions. As of 2015 just over one percent of the population of Thailand are Christians. Of that group, 400,000 are estimated to be Catholics.

Thailand's Department of Religion, currently under the Ministry of Culture, has formally recognised five major Christian churches/denominations: the Roman Catholic Church, the Southern Baptists, the Seventh-day Adventists, the Church of Christ in Thailand, and the Evangelical Fellowship of Thailand. Although not officially recognised, missionaries of the Church of Jesus Christ of Latter-day Saints (Mormons) have been active in Thailand for decades, though their converts are comparatively few.
Also present Jehovah's Witnesses 
with over 5200 members and 140 congregations

Judaism

Judaism in Thailand dates back to the 17th century, with the arrival of a few Baghdadi Jewish families. The present community consists of both Ashkenazi (for instance the expatriate community plus some descendants of refugees from imperial Russia and later the Soviet Union), and Sephardi Jews, who were born in such places as Afghanistan, Iran and Syria, and wealthy gem traders. Most of the Jewish community in Thailand, consisting of an estimated 2,000 residents, reside in Bangkok, although there are at any given time thousands of tourists (some long-term) coming primarily from Israel. There are Jewish synagogues in Phuket, Chiang Mai, and Ko Samui, but no community there.

Other religions

Sikhism

The first Sikh known to have come to Thailand was Ladha Singh, who arrived in 1890. Other Sikhs joined him in the early 1900s, and by 1911 more than a hundred Sikh families had settled in Thailand, mainly in Thonburi Region. There were at that time no gurdwaras (Sikh temples), and religious prayers were held in private homes every Sunday and on gurpurab days. The Sikh community continued to grow, and in 1912 it was decided to build a gurdwara. It stands today in Bangkok's Pahurat area and imitates the Golden Temple in Amritsar Punjab, India. A tiny but influential community of Sikhs live in the country's cities, most engaged in retail commerce.

Freedom of religion
Thai law provides for freedom of religion, and the government generally respects this right in practice. It does not, however, register new religious groups that have not been accepted into one of the existing religious governing bodies on doctrinal or other grounds. In practice, unregistered religious organisations operate freely, and the government's practice of not recognising any new religious groups does not restrict the activities of unregistered religious groups.

The government officially limits the number of foreign missionaries that may work in the country, although unregistered missionaries are present in large numbers and are allowed to live and work freely. There have been no widespread reports of societal abuses or discrimination based on religious belief or practice. However, in the far southern border provinces, continued separatist violence has resulted in mistrust in relations between the Buddhist and Muslim communities.

Notes

References

Citations

Sources

See also

 Religion in Myanmar
 Religion in China
 Religion in Laos
 Religion in Vietnam
Jainism in Southeast Asia

 
Thailand